The Erligang culture is a Bronze Age urban civilization and archaeological culture in China that existed from approximately 1600 to 1400 BC. The primary site, Zhengzhou Shang City, was discovered at Erligang, within the modern city of Zhengzhou, Henan, in 1951.

Major sites
The culture was centered in the Yellow River valley. In its early years, it expanded rapidly, reaching the Yangtze River. The culture then gradually shrank from its early peak.

Zhengzhou

The walls were of rammed earth construction, a technique dating back to Chinese Neolithic sites of the Longshan culture (c. 3000–1900 BC). Large workshops were located outside the city walls, including a bone workshop, a pottery workshop and two bronze vessel workshops. The modern city sits on the remains of the Erligang city, rendering archaeological excavations impossible. Therefore, most of the information about the culture comes from studying other Erligang sites.

Panlongcheng
The large site at Panlongcheng, on the Yangtze River in Hubei, is currently the largest excavated site of Erligang culture. It was discovered in 1954, and excavated in 1974 and 1976.
Since Zhengzhou lacked access to local bronze metals, sites like Panlongcheng were probably used to secure distant metal resources. A large number of bronze wares were found in Panlong City. Through carbon dating of wood samples unearthed from Tonglu Mountain in Dazhi, Hubei and Tongling Mining and Metallurgical Site in Ruichang, Jiangxi, comparisons were made between the bronze wares unearthed in Panlongcheng City and Tonglu Mountain, It was found that the mineral elements of Panlongcheng bronzes are the same as those of Tonglushan, which indicates that the copper of Panlongcheng originated from Tonglushan.

Bronze vessels

Erligang was the first archaeological culture in China to show widespread use of bronze vessel castings. Bronze vessels became much more widely used and uniform in style than at Erlitou.

Relation to traditional accounts
Many Chinese archaeologists believe that the ancient city of Zhengzhou was one of the early capitals of the Shang dynasty mentioned in traditional histories. However many scholars and Western archaeologists have pointed out that, unlike the later Anyang settlement, no written records have been found at Erligang to link the archaeological remains with the official history.

References

Further reading
 
 

Archaeological cultures of China
Bronze Age in China
Shang dynasty
16th-century BC establishments in China